Emmanuel is a romanization of the Hebrew name Immanuel, meaning "God with us".

Emmanuel may also refer to:
 Emmanuel (name), a given name and surname

Churches 
 Emmanuel Association, a Methodist Christian denomination in the conservative holiness movement
 Emmanuel Community, a Catholic charismatic community

Educational institutions 
 Emmanuel City Technology College, Gateshead, England
 Emmanuel College, Boston, Massachusetts, US
 Emmanuel College, Cambridge, England

Arts 
 Emmanuel, a magazine published by the Congregation of the Blessed Sacrament in the United States
 Emmanuel (album), an album by Anuel AA
 Emmanuel (EP), an extended play by rapper Ameer Vann

Music 
Emmanuel (singer) (born 1955) Mexican singer

See also
Emanuel (disambiguation)
Immanuel (disambiguation)